The Fragrances and Flavours Association of India (FAFAI) as an statutory body was formed in 1948 for promoting and developing industries engaged in the manufacture of Fragrances and Flavours and currently has 300 enterprises. The contribution from the industries engaged in manufacture of Fragrances and Flavours is estimated to be $500 million.

History 
The Fragrances and Flavours Association of India was formed as apex body in 1948 primarily aimed for the growth and development of industries engaged in manufacturing of various products relating to various Fragrances and Flavours. 

As of 2023, Rishabh C Kothari is the president of the association.

Members 
The FAFAI covers around 1000 enterprises which operates as small,medium and large units and are considered ancillary to Fast Moving Consumer Goods (FMCG).

Raw Material Recommendation 

The Fragrances and Flavours Association of India has prepared a list of more than 9000 ingredients the use of which are considered safe in manufacture of products related to  various Fragrances and Flavours in India.

Contribution to Economy 

The contribution of revenue from industries engaged in manufacturing of Fragrances and Flavours is estimated at around $ 500 million.

Challenges 

The industries engaged in the manufacturing of Fragrances and Flavours are facing the challenges of China due to challenges in logistics and raw material cost.

See Also 

 Economy of India

References

External links 
 Official site

Professional associations based in India